Raul Årmann was an épée fencer. He was a member of the Swedish team, which won the bronze medal in the 1933 World Fencing Championships.

History 
Årmann originated from Sweden, and was an épée fencer. In 1933, he was a member of the Swedish team at the 1933 World Fencing Championships in Budapest. The team won a bronze medal in the team épée.

References 

Swedish male épée fencers
20th-century Swedish people